Gov. Thomas Hutchinson's Ha-ha is a historic ha-ha at 100–122 Randolph Avenue in Milton, Massachusetts, United States.

The ha-ha (a sunken wall which permits unblocked views, while still serving functions of a wall such as delineating a border and preventing livestock from crossing) was constructed by then-Acting Governor Thomas Hutchinson in the early 1700s, when the land was part of his extensive Milton estate. It was added to the National Register of Historic Places in 1975, and is a contributing property to the Milton Hill Historic District.

The ha-ha, which is of modest size, is now on the grounds of St. Michael's Church at 100 Randolph Avenue, approximately one block from Governor Hutchinson's Field, a property of The Trustees of Reservations.  Park on the street and walk in the driveway to the left (north) of the church.  The ha-ha, with a descriptive sign, is on the right before the bend of the driveway.

See also
National Register of Historic Places listings in Milton, Massachusetts

References

National Register of Historic Places in Milton, Massachusetts
Buildings and structures completed in 1771
Milton, Massachusetts
Individually listed contributing properties to historic districts on the National Register in Massachusetts